Gnamptopteryx is a monotypic moth genus in the family Geometridae erected by George Hampson in 1893. Its only species, Gnamptopteryx perficita, was first described by Francis Walker in 1858. It is found in India, Sri Lanka, and Taiwan.

The Taiwan population is classified as a subspecies - Gnamptopteryx perficita cymatia (Hampson, 1902).

References

Larentiinae
Moths of Asia
Moths described in 1893
Monotypic moth genera